Serbia competed at the 2022 World Athletics Championships in Eugene, Oregon from 15 to 24 July 2022. Serbia had entered 3 athletes.

Results

Men
Track and road events

Women
Field events

References

Serbia
World Championships in Athletics
2022